Favrskov Municipality is a municipality in Central Denmark Region in Denmark north of Aarhus and is a part of the Aarhus area. January 2022.

The largest towns within the municipality are Hadsten, Hinnerup and Hammel.

Favrskov Municipality  was created on 1 January 2007 as a result of Kommunalreformen ("The Municipal Reform" of 2007). It is a fusion of the former municipalities of Hadsten, Hammel, Hinnerup, and Hvorslev, as well as the southern part of the former Langå Municipality. The northern parts of Favrskov Municipality, consisting roughly of the former municipalities of Hadsten, Langå and Hvorslev, are part of the larger geographical region of Kronjylland (Crown Jutland).

The municipality is part of Business Region Aarhus and of the East Jutland metropolitan area, which had a total population of 1.378 million in 2016.

According to Danmarks Statistik, from 2005 to 2009, this was the third-fastest growing municipality out of 98.

Location

Politics

Municipal council
Favrskov's municipal council consists of 25 members, elected every four years.

Below are the municipal councils elected since the Municipal Reform of 2007.

Notable people 
 Anne Sophie Reventlow (1693 in Clausholm Castle – 1743) Queen of Denmark and Norway from 1721 to 1730 as the second wife of Frederick IV of Denmark and Norway.

Sister cities
The following cities are twinned with Hadsten and Hinnerup:
  Saarijärvi, Western Finland, Finland

References

Sources
 Municipal statistics: NetBorger Kommunefakta, delivered from KMD aka Kommunedata (Municipal Data)
 Municipal mergers and neighbors: Eniro new municipalities map

External links 

 Favrskov municipality's website 
 Information about Favrskov municipality
 Municipal and Regional Key Figures

 
Municipalities of the Central Denmark Region
Municipalities of Denmark
Populated places established in 2007